Niall Breen (born 8 May 1986 in Dundalk) is an Irish racing driver. He has competed in such series as Formula Three Euroseries and the British Formula Three Championship. He was champion of the 2006 Formula BMW UK season for Fortec Motorsport, taking nine wins in all and finishing 95 points ahead of runner-up Oliver Turvey.

References

External links
 Official website
 

1986 births
Living people
People from Dundalk
Irish racing drivers
Formula BMW UK drivers
British Formula Renault 2.0 drivers
British Formula Three Championship drivers
Formula 3 Euro Series drivers
Porsche Supercup drivers
Sportspeople from County Louth
Carlin racing drivers
Manor Motorsport drivers

Fortec Motorsport drivers